William Robert Giblin (4 November 1840 – 17 January 1887) was Premier of Tasmania (Australia) from 5 March 1878 until 20 December 1878 and from 1879 until 1884.

Early life
Giblin was born at Hobart, Van Diemen's Land (now Tasmania), son of William Giblin, clerk of the registrar of deeds, and his wife Marion, née Falkiner. He was educated first at a school kept by his uncle Robert Giblin and afterwards at Hobart High School. Leaving school at 13 Giblin was articled to John Roberts, solicitor. Giblin was a great reader with a retentive memory, in 1862 won a prize for the best poem on the conversion of St Paul, and about this time delivered some lectures on literary subjects. In 1864 he was admitted as a barrister and solicitor, entered into partnership with John Dobson and subsequently with one of his sons Henry Dobson. Also in 1864 Giblin was one of the founders of the Hobart Working Men's Club, was elected its president, and was re-elected on several occasions subsequently. Giblin began to interest himself in public life and especially in the proposed railway from Hobart to Launceston.

Political career
In 1869 Giblin was elected without opposition as member for Hobart Town in the Tasmanian House of Assembly, and in February 1870 became attorney-general in the James Milne Wilson ministry. Wilson resigned in November 1872 and was succeeded by Frederick Innes. In August 1873 Giblin carried a motion of want of confidence but did not desire the premiership, and Alfred Kennerley formed a cabinet with Giblin as his attorney-general. This ministry lasted nearly three years and Giblin was able to bring in some useful legal legislation. In June 1877 Giblin lost his seat at the general election, but he was soon afterwards elected for Wellington and joined the cabinet of Sir Philip Fysh as attorney-general, exchanging that position for the treasurership a few days later. When Fysh left for London in March 1878 Giblin succeeded him as premier and held office until 20 December 1878. The William Crowther government which followed could do little in the conditions of the period, and when it resigned in October 1879 Giblin realised that the only way to get useful work done would be to form a coalition ministry. This he succeeded in doing and he became premier and colonial treasurer on 30 October 1879. His government lasted nearly five years and during that period the finances of the colony were put in order and railways and roads were built. Important work was done although the conservative elements in the Tasmanian Legislative Council succeeded in hampering the government to some extent. In December 1881 Giblin exchanged the position of treasurer for that of attorney-general with John S. Dodds. He represented Tasmania at the intercolonial tariff conference at Sydney in 1881 and at the Sydney federal conference in 1883, and took an important part in the debates.

Late life
In August 1884, Giblin resigned from the cabinet on account of failing health; on 7 February 1885 he accepted the position of puisne judge of the Supreme Court of Tasmania, and during the absence of the chief justice administered the government in October–November 1886. Giblin died of heart disease in Hobart on 17 January 1887, aged 46. In 1865, he married Emily Jean Perkins who survived him along with their four sons and three daughters. His second son was the statistician Lyndhurst Giblin.

The prominent bluff to the south of Legges Tor on the Ben Lomond plateau is named after William Giblin, as his son was a member of the survey party that explored the northern aspect of the mountain in 1907.

The banker and cricketer Vincent Wanostrocht Giblin (1817–1884) was a nephew, and many other members of the Giblin family were prominent in Tasmanian society.

References

 
 
 Tasmanian photographer Thomas J. Nevin 1842-1923

External links

Premiers of Tasmania
1840 births
1887 deaths
Judges of the Supreme Court of Tasmania
Politicians from Hobart
Leaders of the Opposition in Tasmania
Treasurers of Tasmania
Colony of Tasmania judges
19th-century Australian politicians